A Song Goes Round the World is a 1958 West German musical film directed by Géza von Bolváry and starring Hans Reiser,  Sabine Sesselmann, and Ruth Stephan. The film is a biopic of the singer and film actor Joseph Schmidt. The title is a reference to his best-known song and a 1933 film of the same title in which he starred.

It was made at the Bavaria Studios in Munich. The film's sets were designed by the art director Ernst Richter.

Cast

References

Bibliography

External links 
 

1958 films
1958 musical films
1950s biographical films
German musical films
German biographical films
West German films
1950s German-language films
Films directed by Géza von Bolváry
Biographical films about singers
Films about Nazi Germany
Constantin Film films
Cultural depictions of German men
Cultural depictions of Romanian men
Cultural depictions of Austrian men
Cultural depictions of pop musicians
1950s German films
Films shot at Bavaria Studios